Kick a Little is the third studio album by American country music band Little Texas. Released in 1994 on Warner Bros. Records, it was certified platinum by the RIAA for sales of one million copies. Three singles were released from this album: the title track, "Amy's Back in Austin" and "Southern Grace"; respectively, these reached #5, #4, and #27 on the Hot Country Songs charts. This was also the band's last album to feature keyboardist and co-lead vocalist Brady Seals, who left later that year to pursue a solo career, prior to the band’s tour to promote the album.

Track listing

Personnel
Little Texas
Del Gray – drums
Porter Howell – slide guitar, electric guitar, acoustic guitar, six-string bass guitar, steel guitar, background vocals
Dwayne O'Brien – acoustic guitar, lead vocals, background vocals
Duane Propes – bass guitar, background vocals
Tim Rushlow – acoustic guitar, lead vocals, background vocals
Brady Seals – piano, keyboards, Hammond B-3 organ, electric guitar, lead vocals, background vocals

Additional musicians
Robert Bailey, Kim Fleming, and Donna McElroy - background vocals (tracks 4, 5)
Mark Casstevens - harmonica (track 9)
Louis Conti - percussion (tracks 1-8)
Paul Franklin - pedal steel guitar (tracks 6, 9, 10), Dobro (track 7)
Rob Hajacos - fiddle (tracks 3, 9)
Bob Mason - cello (track 4)
Pat McLaughlin - acoustic guitar (track 5)
Jay Spell - accordion (track 3)

Technical
Christy DiNapoli - production
Doug Grau - production
John Hampton - recording, mixing
Bob Ludwig - mastering
Little Texas - production

Charts

Weekly charts

Year-end charts

References

1994 albums
Little Texas (band) albums
Warner Records albums